Isayama (written: 諫山) is a Japanese surname. Notable people with the surname include:

, Japanese manga artist
, Japanese singer

Japanese-language surnames